John Brady (born 28 July 1973) is an Irish Sinn Féin politician who has been a Teachta Dála (TD) for the Wicklow constituency since the 2016 general election. He had been a member of Wicklow County Council from 2011 to 2016 and also a member of Bray Town Council from 2004 to 2014.

Political career
Brady first became involved in politics in 2004, when he was elected to Bray Town Council. In 2009, he was elected to Wicklow County Council. Following the 2016 general election, he was elected to the Dáil Éireann as a Sinn Féin TD for Wicklow. He sat on the Oireachtas Committee on Employment Affairs and Social Protection. He was re-elected in the 2020 general election. In 2019, it was reported that Brady was one of nine Sinn Féin elected representatives who had chosen not to make a recommended contribution to the party.

Personal life
Brady lives in a council house in Bray with his wife and five children. Before entering politics, he was a carpenter and practised professionally until 2013 when his business collapsed. In 2004, he extended his council house with an attic extension installed on the roof. As he lacked planning permission for the extension, Wicklow County Council attempted to evict Brady, which he refused to consent to. Brady took the council to the High Court in 2016 over it. Brady alleged the eviction notice was issued as a result of his criticism of the council, claiming the random inspection that discovered the work was out of standard practice for council inspectors. Brady was successful in the court case and the eviction notice was quashed.

References

External links

John Brady's page on the Sinn Féin website

Living people
Members of the 32nd Dáil
Sinn Féin TDs (post-1923)
Local councillors in County Wicklow
1973 births
Members of the 33rd Dáil